This article lists the episodes and short summaries of the 70th to 94th episodes of the  anime series, known in the English dub as the fifth season of Ranma ½ or "Martial Mayhem".

Rumiko Takahashi's manga series Ranma ½ was adapted into two anime series: Ranma ½ which ran on Fuji TV for 18 episodes and Ranma ½ Nettōhen which ran for 143. The first TV series was canceled due to low ratings in September 1989, but was then brought back in December as the much more popular and much longer-running Ranma ½ Nettōhen.

Viz Media licensed both anime for English dubs and labeled them as one. They released them in North America in seven DVD collections they call "seasons". Nettōhen episodes 70 to 94 (excluding 72) are season 5, which was given the title "Martial Mayhem". Episode 72 was inserted as episode 88 in season 4.



Episode list
Note Episode 72 was not included in Viz's season 5 release, but in season 4. It is shown below for proper chronological purposes.

References
 Ranma ½ Perfect Edition Anime Episode Summaries

1991 Japanese television seasons
Season 5